The Seneschal's House stands at the corner of Halton Brow and Main Street in Runcorn, Liverpool City Region. It is recorded in the National Heritage List for England as a designated Grade II* listed building. 

The house is dated 1598, which makes it the oldest standing building in the Liverpool City Region.  It was latterly a farmhouse although was originally built by the judge John King, called to the bar in London in the late 16th century and was originally known as "John King's New House"; the occupation of the original owner of the house, led to a later owner, Geoffrey Barraclough, Professor of History at Liverpool University in the mid 20th century coining the current name of the house. The house was, in fact, inhabited originally by a seneschal, that is the original owner, John King.

The house is built with sandstone and it has a stone slate roof with a sandstone ridge.  It is two storeys with an attic roof.  At the front are three projections rising to the full height of the house.  The central projection contains a porch; the others have bay windows with mullions.  Each projection is surmounted by a gable and there are gables at each end of the house.  The gables have corbels and moulded copings with finials at their summits.

See also

Grade I and II* listed buildings in Halton (borough)
Listed buildings in Runcorn (urban area)

References

Further reading

Halton, Seneschals House
Buildings and structures in Runcorn
Houses completed in 1598
Grade II* listed houses